Claudio Repetto (born 2 February 1997) is an Italian footballer who plays as a forward for Miami FC in the USL Championship.

Career

Genoa
Repetto played as part of the Genoa academy for 10 years, spending time on loan with Serie D clubs RapalloBogliasco, Lavagnese, and Sestri Levante.

College and amateur
In 2017, Repetto moved to the United States to play college soccer at Grand View University in Des Moines, Iowa. In two seasons with the Vikings, Repetto scored 18 goals and tallied 9 assists. In 2019, he transferred to Coastal Carolina University, where he played a further two seasons, scoring 7 goals and creating 1 assist in 29 appearances. In 2020, he was named 2020 USC All-Southeast Region Second Team, and co-led the Sun Belt in goals with five in 13 games. Repetto helped lead the Chanticleers to consecutive Sun Belt tournament titles in 2019 and 2020, and one regular-season title in 2020.

In 2018, Repetto appeared for NPSL side Med City, scoring 11 goals in 14 appearances. He also spent time in the USL League Two with Ocean City Nor'easters, netting 8 times in 13 appearances during their 2019 season.

Charleston Battery
On 25 June 2021, Repetto signed with USL Championship side Charleston Battery. He made his debut for the club the following day, appearing as a 74th-minute substitute during a 3–0 victory over Loudoun United.

Repetto went on to have a successful rookie campaign in Charleston, scoring nine goals and tallying three assists in 24 appearances. Leading the team in scoring, he was named the club's offensive player of the year and newcomer of the year by the supporters for 2021.

Phoenix Rising FC
Repetto was transferred from Charleston to Phoenix Rising FC and thereafter signed a multi-year contract with Phoenix on February 12, 2022.

Miami FC
On September 21, 2022, Repetto transferred from Phoenix to Miami FC.

References

External links
Claudio Repetto at Charleston Battery

1997 births
Association football forwards
Charleston Battery players
Phoenix Rising FC players
Coastal Carolina Chanticleers men's soccer players
Genoa C.F.C. players
Living people
Italian footballers
Italian expatriate footballers
Italian expatriates in the United States
Italian expatriate sportspeople in the United States
National Premier Soccer League players
Ocean City Nor'easters players
Footballers from Genoa
U.S.D. Lavagnese 1919 players
U.S.D. Sestri Levante 1919 players
USL Championship players
USL League Two players
Miami FC players